Rhagadochir virgo is a species of webspinner, an insect in the order Embiidina, also known as Embioptera. This species is native to the Republic of the Congo in tropical West Africa.

Ecology
Only females of this species have been found, the insects reproducing by parthenogenesis. Perhaps because of their close inter-relatedness, these insects are notably gregarious, crowding together in their silken tunnels. The insects spin their silk in a co-ordinated fashion and may move to new quarters in an organised group, a behaviour not observed elsewhere among members of this order. A female will lay a batch of eggs and wrap them in silk, often incorporating lichen pieces into the silk covering, which may be a form of providing food for the nymphs when they hatch.

References

Embioptera
Insects described in 1960